Red Prophet: The Tales of Alvin Maker is a twelve-issue comic book limited series by Orson Scott Card, based on Card's The Tales of Alvin Maker novel series. Publication started in March 2006 by Dabel Brothers Productions and was finished in 2008 by Marvel Comics.

The Gold Bug
The hard cover edition of this comic contains as an added bonus a comic adapted from Card's short story "The Gold Bug" which was published in his webzine InterGalactic Medicine Show.

Collected editions
The series has been collected into a couple of trade paperbacks:

Red Prophet: The Tales of Alvin Maker - Volume One  collecting issues #1-6, May 2007
Red Prophet: The Tales of Alvin Maker - Volume Two  collecting issues #7-12, March 2008

See also
List of works by Orson Scott Card
Orson Scott Card

References

External links
 The official Orson Scott Card website

Books by Orson Scott Card
Comics based on fiction